The Munich University of Applied Sciences (HM) was founded in 1971 and is the largest university of applied sciences in Bavaria with about 17,800 students.

The Munich University of Applied Sciences was founded in 1971 by the amalgamation of seven colleges of technology and higher education, some of which date back to the early 19th century. Today it is the largest university of its kind in Bavaria and one of the largest in Germany.

HM collaborates with more than 200 partner universities in Europe, North and South America and Asia. International students make up 13% of the student body.

Staff
HM has about 500 professors, about 700 part-time lecturers, and 511 non-academic staff.

Organisation
HM is organised into the following faculties:
Architecture  
Civil Engineering
Mechanical, Automotive and Aeronautical Engineering  
Electrical Engineering and Information Technology 
Building Services Engineering, Paper and Packaging Technology and Print and Media Technology  
Applied Sciences and Mechatronics
Computer Science and Mathematics
Geoinformatics
Engineering and Management
Business Administration
Applied Social Sciences  
Design
General and Interdisciplinary Studies
Tourism

Campuses 
The university has three campuses: Campus Lothstraße, Campus Pasing and Campus Karlstraße. Campus Lothstraße also includes the buildings of the Department of Design in Infanteriestraße and the Department of Tourism in Schachenmeierstraße.

Campus Lothstraße 
 approx. 11,800 students
 Administration
 Center for continuing education
 Department of  Mechanical, Automotive and Aeronautical Engineering
 Department of Electrical Engineering and Information Technology
 Department of Building Services Engineering, Paper and Packaging Technology and Print and Media Technology
 Department of Applied Sciences and Mechatronics
 Department of Computer Science and Mathematics
 Department of Business Administration
 Department of Design (Infanteriestraße)
 Department of General and Interdisciplinary Studies
 Department of Tourism

Campus Pasing 
 approx. 4,200 students
 Department of Business Administration
 Department of Applied Social Sciences

Campus Karlstraße 
 approx. 1,900 students
 Department of Architecture
 Department of Civil Engineering
 Department of Geoinformatics

See also
 Education in Germany
 List of universities in Germany

References

External links
 

 
Universities of Applied Sciences in Germany
Educational institutions established in 1971
Universities and colleges in Munich